The Methuselah Tree is a giant sequoia located in Mountain Home State Forest, a sequoia grove located in Sequoia National Forest in the Sierra Nevada in eastern California. It is the 28th largest giant sequoia in the world, and could be considered the 27th largest depending on how badly Ishi Giant atrophied during the Rough Fire in 2015.

The Methuselah Tree of the Mountain Home Grove is not to be confused with another Methuselah Tree in the White Mountains of eastern California that is a bristlecone pine (Pinus longaeva), which at one time was considered to be the oldest tree in the world.

History
Jesse Hoskins, who about 1884 named many of the other trees in the Mountain Home Grove, also named the Methuselah tree, imagining that moss streamers hanging down from its bark were reminiscent of the beard of the biblical character Methusaleh, the oldest man in the world. The Methuselah Tree has a broken top and an unusually large diameter at its base, which rivals that of the better known Boole tree in the Converse Basin Grove.

Dimensions
This reduced the height to under , but a new leader at the top has subsequently grown, and the height of the tree continues to increase. Wendell D. Flint in 1987 collected the dimension data given below, which provide a calculated volume that ignores burns.

In 2013 it was found to have  in tree height measurement.

See also
 List of largest giant sequoias
 List of individual trees

References

Notes

Sources
 
 

Individual giant sequoia trees
Natural history of Tulare County, California
Sequoia National Forest
Tulare County, California
History of the Sierra Nevada (United States)
Roadside attractions in California
History of Tulare County, California